The Canada men's national squash team represents Canada in international squash team competitions, and is governed by Squash Canada.

Since 1971, Canada participated in one final of the World Squash Team Open, in 1997.

Current team
 Nick Sachvie
 Shawn Delierre
 Andrew Schnell
 Michael Mehl
 Rahul Sehrawat
 Michael McCue
 David Baillargeon
 Abdur-Rahman Rana

Results

World Team Squash Championships

See also 
 Squash Canada
 World Team Squash Championships
 Canada women's national squash team

References

External links 
 Team Canada

Squash teams
Men's national squash teams
Squash
Squash in Canada